Mirko Boland (born 23 April 1987) is a German professional footballer who plays for VfB Lübeck as a midfielder.

Career
Boland grew up in the Lower Rhine region, North Rhine-Westphalia, and played youth football for SV Rees, FC Schalke 04 and MSV Duisburg. After initially representing the club's reserve team he signed his first professional contract in 2008 with Duisburg.

After failing to break into Duisburg's first team during the 2008–09 season, Boland transferred to 3. Liga club Eintracht Braunschweig during the winter break. Since then he has become a regular starter in Braunschweig's midfield, appearing in over 150 games since 2009. In 2011, he and Eintracht Braunschweig won promotion back into the 2. Bundesliga, followed by promotion into the Bundesliga in 2013.

In July 2018, free agent Boland joined A-League side Adelaide United on a two-year contract. Boland suffered a hamstring strain on 11 November 2018 in a match against Perth Glory which could sideline him for up to six weeks.

In March 2020, it was announced Boland would be return to Germany in summer 2020 to join VfB Lübeck, having agreed a two-year contract.

Career statistics

References

External links

1987 births
Living people
People from Wesel
Sportspeople from Düsseldorf (region)
German footballers
Footballers from North Rhine-Westphalia
Association football midfielders
Eintracht Braunschweig players
MSV Duisburg players
MSV Duisburg II players
Adelaide United FC players
VfB Lübeck players
Bundesliga players
2. Bundesliga players
3. Liga players
Regionalliga players
A-League Men players
German expatriate footballers
German expatriate sportspeople in Australia
Expatriate soccer players in Australia